

Season 
Due to the European achievement in 1963–64 season, Inter also debuted in the Intercontinental Cup facing off with Independiente. After two legs, the aggregate score resulted in a draw; the cup was awarded by a tie-breaker, in which Inter won 1–0 at extra time.

In Serie A Inter suffered a 3–0 loss in the Derby della Madonnina. In late January, there were two draws in row and an uprising defeat, by Foggia in matchday 19. So, over the mid of season, Milan had 7 points over Inter with 15 games to play. The following months saw a historical comeback from the side, that won 13 times and drew twice: 28 points were earned this way, resulting in first place. Mazzola had a central role in team play, scoring 17 goals to be the league's top-scorer.

On May 27, a year exactly from the previous win, Inter retained the European title by beating Benfica at the San Siro: Jair was the scorer.

Squad

Transfers

Competitions

Serie A

Results by round

Matches

Coppa Italia

Quarterfinals

Semifinals

Final

European Cup

Eightfinals

Quarterfinals

Semifinals

Final

Intercontinental Cup

First leg

Second leg

Play-off

Statistics

Players statistics

See also 
History of Grande Inter

References 

1964-1965
UEFA Champions League-winning seasons
1964–65
Internazionale